Claudio Descalzi (born 1955) is an Italian businessman, and the CEO of Italian oil company Eni since May 2014.

Education
Descalzi graduated in physics at the University of Milan in 1979.

Career
Descalzi started to work at Eni  in 1981, when he joined the multinational company operating in the production and distribution of energy as a reservoir engineer.

In 1990, Descalzi was appointed Head of Reservoir and operating activities for Eni Italy, a position which led him to develop a new model and to increase production to 250,000 barrels per day. From 1994 to 1998 He was Managing Director of Eni’s subsidiary in Congo, starting in 1997 the production in the Kitina offshore. In 1998 he became Vice President and Managing Director of NAOC: during this period He started the export of gas produced at the NLNG liquefaction plant and the development of deep-water offshore local projects.

Descalzi was appointed Executive Vice President for Eni Africa, Eni Middle East and Eni China in 2000 and he defined, launched and oversaw the start-up of the Eni Western Libyan, intended to increase the production of barrels per day in Libya from 85,000 to 280,000. From 2002 to 2005 he worked as Executive Vice President for Eni Italy, Eni Africa and Eni Middle East, covering at the same time the role of member of the board of several Eni subsidiaries. In 2005 he was appointed Deputy Chief Operating Officer of the Exploration & Production Division in Eni, a role he held until 2008.

Descalzi became in 2008 Chief Operating Officer of the Exploration & Production Division in Eni, giving his contribution to the definition of the strategic plan of upstream activities in Italy and abroad and starting important projects such as Goliat in Norway (2009), West Hub in Angola (2011) and campaign of exploration in Mozambique (2013). In 2014 he was appointed Chief Executive Officer of Eni.

Descalzi is a member of the National Petroleum Council for 2016/2017. He was previously Chairman of Eni UK (2010 - 2014) and President of Assomineraria (2006 - 2014).

Other activities
 Council on Foreign Relations (CFR), Member of the Global Board of Advisors

Corruption charges
Descalzi and other Eni executive leadership have faced numerous legal sanctions for corruption, particularly based on the company's operations in Nigeria and the Republic of the Congo. In December 2016, Milan prosecutor's office closed the Eni / Nigeria investigation of international corruption by putting under investigation eleven suspects, including the CEO of Eni, Claudio Descalzi. On March 17, 2021, the Milan Court acquitted all the defendants involved in the investigation as there was no case to answer.  On July 19, 2022, the Attorney General waived the appeal before the Second Section of the Court of Appeal of Milan, making the acquittal sentences pronounced in March 2021 definitive.

Honours
2012 - Charles F. Rand Memorial Gold Medal - Society of Petroleum Engineers (SPE) and American Institute of Mining Engineers (AIME). Claudio Descalzi was the very first European man to receive that prestigious international award.
2014 - He was nominated “Man of the year” by Staffetta quotidiana – An Italian magazine on petroleum.
2016 – He was honoured with Laurea Honoris Causa in Environmental and Territorial Engineering at "Tor Vergata" University in Rome.

References

External links

Claudio Descalzi Biography on Eni website

Living people
1955 births
University of Milan alumni
Eni
Italian chief executives